Basketball was contested at the 2013 Summer Universiade from July 7 to July 16 in Kazan, Russia. In total, 40 teams competed in the 2013 Summer Universiade (24 men's teams and 16 women's teams).

Medal summary

Medal table

Medal events

Men

Teams

Women

Teams

References

External links
2013 Summer Universiade – Basketball
Results book

 
2013 in basketball
Basketball
2013
Universiade
2013–14 in Russian basketball